The Hamburger Flugzeugbau HFB 314 was a postwar design project for a twin-turbojet medium-range transport. It was cancelled when the German government decided to fund only international collaborations.

History

In 1958 HFB proposed to the German Government two new transports, the HFB 209 turboprop and the HFB 314 short-range jet transport. The 314 would be a direct competitor to the French Sud Aviation Caravelle, then already under development. Although the German government was initially willing to negotiate over financing the projects, in the end they decided that the German aircraft industry should not develop its own designs but should instead collaborate with other countries. Finance was never made available and HFB could not progress without it. With the competing Boeing 727 and de Havilland DH.121 Trident both also advancing steadily, HFB abandoned the project in 1960.

Design

The HFB 314 was a conventional swept-wing monoplane intended as a 70-78 seat short-to-medium range jet airliner.

The upper fuselage accommodated the crew cockpit and passenger cabin, while the lower half correspondingly housed the nosewheel and cargo bays. The tail was of T type, with the tailplanes attached on either side of an anti-shock fairing on top of the fin. The fairing delayed the onset of shockwaves and accompanying drag increase at high cruising speeds.

The relatively sharply swept wing was mounted low on the fuselage, with the carry-through structure passing between the cargo holds. The inner wing sections were more sharply swept and tapered, and housed the main undercarriage mechanism which retracted inwards so that the wheels lay in the fuselage.

Two Rolls-Royce RB 141/11 turbojets were fitted in blisters protruding from either side of the rear fuselage, with alternatives offered including the General Electric CJ-805-23 or Pratt & Whitney JT3D-3.

Specification

See also

References

Hamburger Flugzeugbau HFB 314